Chester is an unincorporated community in central Sanpete County, Utah, United States.

Description
The population was 178 at the 2000 census.

Chester Ponds (a series of six small reservoirs) are located along the Canal and Oak creeks in the northeastern part of the community.

History
Chester was founded by David Candland. In the beginning the town was named Canal Creek after the waterway from which the community received its water. Candland then changed the name to Chesterfield after his hometown in England; it was later reduced to Chester. Chester had its own post office until 1967.

In August 1885, the San Pete Valley Railway completed its tracks as far south as Chester and began regular service to Nephi (via Moroni and Fountain Green); however, passenger service was not offered until after the "Station House" was completed. The railway ran north–south through the western part of the community, at about 3300 East. The railway was acquired by Union Pacific Railroad in 1890 and extended farther south to Manti by 1984. The railway was taken over by the Denver & Rio Grande Railroad (D&RG) in 1908 and became known as the D&RG San Pete Valley Branch. The branch was later abandoned by the D&RG (by then known as the Denver and Rio Grande Western Railroad) in 1947, leaving the Marysvale Branch, through Spring City, as the nearest rail service.

See also

References

External links

Unincorporated communities in Sanpete County, Utah
Unincorporated communities in Utah